The 1999–2000 Florida Gators men's basketball team represented the University of Florida in the sport of basketball during the 1999–2000 college basketball season.  The Gators competed in Division I of the National Collegiate Athletic Association (NCAA) and the Eastern Division of the Southeastern Conference (SEC).  They were led by head coach Billy Donovan, and played their home games in the O'Connell Center on the university's Gainesville, Florida campus.

The Gators were the SEC regular season champions, winning a share of the title with a 12–4 conference record. They earned a five seed in the 2000 NCAA tournament where they advanced to the Final Four and then made the school's first ever appearance in the NCAA championship game where they lost to Michigan State.  Florida ended the season No. 2 in the final USA Today/ESPN Rankings and were ranked wire-to-wire for the first time in school history.

Roster

Schedule and results

|-
!colspan=9 style=| Regular Season

|-
!colspan=9 style=| SEC Tournament

|-
!colspan=9 style=| NCAA Tournament

Rankings

NBA Draft

References 

Florida Gators men's basketball seasons
Florida
NCAA Division I men's basketball tournament Final Four seasons
Florida
Florida Gators men's basketball team
Florida Gators men's basketball team